Angelo Heilprin (March 31, 1853 – July 17, 1907) was an American geologist,  paleontologist, naturalist, and explorer.

He is mostly known for the part he took into the Peary expedition to Greenland of 1891–1892 and for his observations and photographs of the 1902 eruption of Montagne Pelée in Martinique.

He also was a mountaineer and a painter.

Biography 

Angelo Heilprin was born at Sátoraljaújhely, in the Zemplén County of the Kingdom of Hungary. His family was Jewish. He arrived in the United States from the Austrian Empire with his father Michael and his brother Louis in 1856.

He went back to Europe in 1876 for two years to complete his education. He studied at the Royal School of Mines, London, at the Imperial Geological Institution of Vienna, and at Florence (where he had his only formal training in painting) and Geneva; he also went to Hungary, where he mountaineered in the Carpathians, and to Poland where he visited family for six months.

He then became professor of invertebrate paleontology and of geology at the Academy of Natural Sciences, Philadelphia (1880–1900), curator of the museum of that institution (1883–1892), professor of geology at the Wagner Free Institute of Science in Philadelphia (1885–1890); and he was the first president of the Geographical Society of Philadelphia, serving for seven years. In 1883, he was elected as a member to the American Philosophical Society.

Also a painter, Heilprin exhibited Autumn's First Whisper at the Pennsylvania Academy of the Fine Arts in 1880, and Forest Exiles at the Boston Museum of Fine Arts in 1883.

In 1902 he founded the American Alpine Club.

In 1904, he was appointed as a lecturer at Yale.

Research 

In Heilprin's life research travels alternate with periods of teaching and writing. He visited Florida, the Bermudas, Mexico, Greenland and Martinique while also devoting work to his more immediate surroundings. His mountaineering skills were put to use many times in his scientific work.

In 1886, Heilprin undertook an expedition to the then little-known west coast of Florida. 
In 1887 he went to the Bermudas with members of his classes to study coral reefs, confirming Charles Darwin's 1842 views expressed in The structure and distribution of coral reefs. <br/ >
In 1888, Heilprin was in Mexico, where he ascended volcanos: Ixtaccihuatl, Nevado de Toluca, Pico de Orizaba and Popocatepetl, establishing their altitudes with barometric measures. He also shed light on questions about the geology of the Yucatan and the coral reefs of the western Gulf of Mexico.

En 1891 Heilprin embarked with Robert Peary on an expedition to Greenland organized by the Academy of Natural Sciences. Peary was the leader of the north-bound expedition, which was to prove that Greenland is an island. Heilprin headed the "Western Expedition" comprising half a dozen scientists. The scientists collected data then returned to the U.S., while Peary remained in Greenland. But the next year Heilprin was back to Greenland, leading the "Peary relief expedition".

In 1902, when Montagne Pelée in Martinique erupted, reducing the city of Saint-Pierre to ashes, Heilprin was one of the first scientists to arrive to the site. His works, photographs and eyewitness account of the phenomena and their consequences are unique. He was the first geologist to ascend a side of the crater.  He revisited it in 1903 and in February 1906 descended into the crater itself.

Remembrance 
 In 1976 the American Alpine Club established a yearly "Angelo Heilprin Citation".
 The Heilprin Glacier, having its terminus at the head of the Inglefield Fjord in NW Greenland, was named after him by Robert Peary.

Eponymy 
 Cyanocorax heilprini (the Azure-naped Jay), a species in the family of Corvidae, was named after him.
 Hypsiboas heilprini also bears his name.

Selected works and documents

Selected works 
  
 
 
  
  
  
  
  Volume VII of The iconographic encyclopaedia

Articles for the general public 
 Popular Science Monthly articles by Heilprin can be found on Wikisource

With Louis Heilprin
 Lippincott's new gazetteer: a complete pronouncing gazetteer or geographical dictionary of the world, containing the most recent and authentic information respecting the countries, cities, towns, resorts, islands, rivers, mountains, seas, lakes, etc., in every portion of the globe, Philadelphia, J. B. Lippincott Co., 1916, ©1911 New edition: 1922

Documents 
 Documents (1871–1896) in the archives of the  Philadelphia Academy of Natural Sciences. Includes 34 items, among them part of a diary of the expedition to Greenland; not included in the total: 18 stereographs of the eruption of Montagne Pelée

References 
 "Heilprin, Phineas Mendel", in  Appletons' Cyclopædia of American Biography on Wikisource. Biographical notes on Michael, Louis et Angelo
 Gustav Pollak, Michael Heilprin and his sons: a biography, New York, Dodd, Mead, 1912. Biographies of Michael, Louis and Angelo, and generous excerpts from their works

External links 
Jewish Encyclopedia: "Heilprin, Angelo" by Cyrus Adler & Frank Vizetelly (1906).

Notes 

1853 births
1907 deaths
People from Sátoraljaújhely
American geologists
American non-fiction writers
American explorers
American volcanologists
19th-century American painters
American male painters
20th-century American painters
Hungarian Jews
Jewish American scientists
Jewish painters
American paleontologists
American people of Hungarian-Jewish descent
Hungarian people of Polish-Jewish descent
Austrian Empire emigrants to the United States
Presidents of the American Association of Geographers
19th-century American male artists
20th-century American male artists